Faistos is a municipality in Heraklion regional unit, Crete, Greece. The seat of the municipality is the village Moires. It is named after the ancient city Phaistos, located in the municipality.

Municipality
The municipality Faistos was formed at the 2011 local government reform by the merger of the following 3 former municipalities, that became municipal units:
Moires
Tympaki
Zaros

Geography

Climate

References

Municipalities of Crete
Messara Plain
Populated places in Heraklion (regional unit)